Deschampsia robusta is a species of grass in the family Poaceae.  It is found on Gough Island, near Tristan da Cunha in the South Atlantic Ocean.

References

robusta
Flora of Gough Island
Data deficient plants
Taxonomy articles created by Polbot